Ken Mettler (born August 21, 1953) is a Past President of the California Republican Assembly and a conservative political activist.  He also served as President of the Republican Assembly of Kern County, a local chapter of the C.R.A., Vice President of the Kern High School District Board of Trustees, and President of the Rosedale Union School District Board of Trustees.

Biography
Mettler worked part-time for the Los Angeles Police Department as he earned his Bachelor of Science degree from California State University, Los Angeles in 1973.  He then earned a Master of Public Administration degree from University of California, Riverside in 1975. He subsequently served in the Peace Corps in Managua, Nicaragua, where he coordinated a survey of earthquake-damaged buildings.  At the same time he began a cattle herd with a Nicaraguan national but had to dissolve the venture when the Sandinistas began killing livestock and all American citizens were directed to leave.

Upon return to the USA, Mettler worked for the University of Southern California and then for Doyle, Dane, & Berbach Advertising Agency. He then went to work for Tenneco Oil Company as an analyst for two years before forming METCO Development Corporation and METCO Homes, Inc. in California and Arizona, where he worked for thirty years developing residential and industrial subdivisions . Currently he owns KLM Omni, Inc., which provides residential construction management services, petroleum land services, and construction and real estate litigation support.

Controversies
In 2008, Ken Mettler, Kern County Chairman for Proposition 8 - Protect Traditional Marriage, was involved in an altercation with an individual protesting against Prop 8. He punched and kicked the protester. Nobody was seriously injured. No criminal complaint was filed.

Political activity
(2016) Candidate, United States House of Representatives, California, District 23 (unsuccessful)
(2010) Candidate, California State Assembly (unsuccessful)
(2009–10) President of the California Republican Assembly
(2006–10) Trustee, Kern High School District
(2007–09) President of the Republican Assembly of Kern County
(2008) Kern County Chairman for Yes on Prop 8 - "Protect Traditional Marriage"
(2008) Kern County Chairman for Yes on Prop. 98-Property Rights Protection
(1995-06) Trustee, Rosedale Union School District
(2006) Chairman of a California State Assembly primary campaign
(1995) Initiated the Special Assessment District Disclosure Notice City Ordinance
(1993) Spokesman for Proposition 174 – School Voucher Initiative
(1988) Initiated the Notice of Default Current Trustor state legislation attempt
(1986) Initiated the FNMA Notice of Mortgage Insurance cancellation federal policy
(1980–84) Director of Fruitvale Mutual Water Company, Inc.
(1982) Initiated Surface Rights vs. Mineral Rights county ordinance
(1982) Chairman of a California State Senate primary campaign
(1982) Treasurer of Californians Against Regulatory Excess

Affiliations
(2008–Present) Member of the California Republican Assembly
(1977–86; 2007–13) Elected member of the Kern County Republican Central Committee
(2005–13) Member of Kern Citizens for Property Rights

References

External links 
http://www.kenmettler.com
http://www.californiarepublicanassembly.com/
 http://www.klmhomesinc.com 

1953 births
California Republicans
California State University, Los Angeles alumni
Living people
Peace Corps volunteers
Politicians from Bakersfield, California
University of California, Riverside alumni